Trichomyia lengleti is an extinct species of Cretaceous flies found in the Charentes region of France.

It was discovered in 2008 when x-ray technology was used to peer into opaque pieces of amber.

References

Psychodidae
Cretaceous insects
Prehistoric insects of Europe
Fauna of France
Charente